Ibroihim Youssouf Djoudja (born 6 May 1994) is a Comorian professional footballer who plays for South African club TS Sporting and the Comoros national team.

International career
Djoudja debuted internationally for the Comoros national team in a COSAFA Cup on 27 May 2018 in a 1–1 draw against Seychelles. A year later at another COSAFA Cup, Djoudja scored his first goal for Comoros against Eswatini resulting a 2–2 draw.

On 6 September 2019, Djoudja appeared for the 2022 FIFA World Cup qualification set in Qatar and scored his first major goal in the competition resulting a 1–1 draw against Togo.

Career statistics
Scores and results list Comoros's goal tally first, score column indicates score after each Djoudja goal.

References

External links
 
 

1994 births
Living people
Comorian footballers
Association football forwards
Comoros international footballers
2021 Africa Cup of Nations players
Namibia Premier League players
Volcan Club de Moroni players
African Stars F.C. players
TS Sporting F.C. players
Comorian expatriate footballers
Comorian expatriate sportspeople in Namibia
Expatriate footballers in Namibia
Expatriate soccer players in South Africa